The list of those invited to join the Academy of Motion Picture Arts and Sciences as members in 2005.

Actors
Gael García Bernal
Thomas Haden Church
Jennifer Coolidge
Will Ferrell
Jamie Foxx
Paul Giamatti
Catalina Sandino Moreno
Sophie Okonedo
Clive Owen
Charlotte Rampling
Jean Reno
Stellan Skarsgård
Imelda Staunton
Mykelti Williamson
Zhang Ziyi

Animators
Andrew Adamson
Kathy Altieri
Signe Baumane
Baker Bloodworth
John Hughes
Scott F. Johnston
Chris Landreth
Tim Miller

At-Large
Ian Bryce
Fred Chandler
Charles Newirth

Scientific and technical
Glenn Kennel

Set decorators
John Bush
Jim Erickson
Debra Schutt

Cinematographers
Curtis Clark
Jim Denault
Robert Fraisse
Dick Pope
Tami Reiker
Lisa Rinzler
Jerry Zielinski

Directors
Alejandro Amenábar
Marc Forster
Oliver Hirschbiegel
Andy Tennant
Joel Zwick

Documentary
Nick Broomfield
Peter Davis
Kirby Dick
Kathleen Glynn
Robert Greenwald
Stacy Peralta

Executives
Paul G. Allen
Doug Belgrad
Robert Berney
Ann Daly
Daniel Ferleger
Camela Galano
Brad Grey
Steven Jobs
Michael Lynton
Kevin McCormick
Bruce Tobey
Matt Tolmach

Film editors
Jim Miller
Julie Monroe
Debra Neil-Fisher
Nancy Richardson
Kevin Tent

Live action short filmmakers
Andrea Arnold
Andrew J. Sacks
Nacho Vigalondo

Makeup and hairstylists
John Blake
J. Roy Helland

Music
Bruno Coulais
Jan A. P. Kaczmarek
Mark Mothersbaugh
Edward Shearmur

Producers
Avi Arad
Elizabeth Avellán
Ross Katz
Michael London
Scott Mosier
Denise Robert

Production designers
John Dexter
Jim Dultz
Andrew McRae Hennah
Gemma Jackson
Anthony Pratt

Public relations
Breena Camden
Laura Carrillo
Susan J. Kroll
Michael Moses
Dennis Rice
Steven Mark Siskind

Sound
David Arnold
Steve Cantamessa
Andrew Koyama
Hugh Waddell
Michael Wilhoit
David Mark Young

Visual effects artists
Joseph B. Bauer
Nicholas Brooks
Blair Clark
Mark Forker
Robert Grasmere
Matthew R. Gratzner
Roger John Guyett
Christophe Hery
David S. Williams, Jr.

Writers
Paul Haggis
David Magee
Keir Pearson
Jose Rivera
David N. Weiss
Mike White

References

2005
Invitees,2005